Born to Sing is the fifth studio album by American country singer Connie Smith. It was released in September 1966 via RCA Victor Records and contained 12 tracks. The album was her first to include string instrumentation. It reached the top five of the Billboard Country LP's chart and included the single "Ain't Had No Lovin'".

Background
In 1964, Connie Smith emerged with the number one single titled "Once a Day". The song jump started her career and helped bring the singles "Then and Only Then" and "If I Talk to Him" into the country top ten. During the mid 1960s, country music record producers saw potential to expand into pop markets. They encouraged several artists to record music tailored in this direction. RCA Victor producers Chet Atkins and Bob Ferguson (the latter was Smith's producer) saw crossover potential in her music. In 1966, they organized Smith's sessions for her next album to be recorded with more pop influences. Ferguson brought in arranger Bill Walker to include string instrumentation. This would be Smith's first album to have a string section. This decisions crafted Smith's next studio album Born to Sing. The album was named for the title track, which was composed by Cy Coben.

Recording and content
Smith went into the studio to record the tracks for Born to Sing between April 7 and May 11, 1966. The sessions were produced by Bob Ferguson and took place at RCA Studio A in Nashville, Tennessee. Smith told writer Colin Escott that she was uncomfortable recording in Studio A because of its size. "In Studio B I could judge from the walls what my voice was doing. I controlled it by what I heard and what I felt in the room. The singer loses control in the big studio and the studio takes over." The album's title track was intended for Hank Williams Jr. but was instead cut by Smith. Also included were two selections composed by Dallas Frazier: "A Touch of Yesterday" and "Ain't Had No Lovin'". Three tracks were covers of pop selections: Dean Martin's "I Will" along with Anita Bryant's "Paper Roses" and "In My Little Corner of the World". The track "Gone" was first a country hit by Ferlin Husky. Remaining tracks were original recordings composed by June Carter, Cy Coben, Liz Anderson and several others.

Release and reception

Born to Sing was first released in September 1966 on the RCA Victor label. It was Smith's fifth studio album in her career. It was distributed as a vinyl LP, containing six songs on both side of the record. Several decades later, Born to Sing was reissued to digital and streaming sites which included Apple Music. In its original release, the album spent 25 weeks on the Billboard magazine Country LP's chart. It became her third and final album to reach the number one spot on the LP's chart, peaking there in December 1966. The album received a 4.5 star rating from AllMusic. Born to Sing included the single "Ain't Had No Lovin'", which was released by RCA Victor in May 1966. It became her highest-peaking song on the Billboard Hot Country Songs chart since "Once a Day", climbing to the number two position.

Track listings

Vinyl version

Digital version

Personnel 
All credits are adapted from the liner notes of Born to Sing and the biography booklet by Colin Escott also titled Born to Sing.

Musical personnel

 Byron Bache – cello
 Brenton Banks – violin
 Howard Carpenter – violin
 Jerry Carrigan – drums
 Dorothy Dillard – background vocals
 Ray Edenton – guitar
 Dolores D. Edgin – background vocals
 Solie Fott – viola
 Kenneth Goldsmith – violin
 Buddy Harman – drums
 Priscilla Hubbard – background vocals
 Lillian Hunt – violin
 Roy Huskey – Bass
 Martin Katahn – viola

 Shelly Kurland – violin
 Piere Menard – violin
 Louis Nunley – background vocals
 Jimmy Lance – guitar
 Len Miller – drums
 Wayne Moss – electric guitar
 Weldon Myrick – steel guitar
 Earl Porter – electric guitar
 Connie Smith – lead vocals
 Jerry Smith – piano
 Dorothy Walker – viola
 Pete Wade – guitar
 Harvey Wolfe – cello
 William Guilford Wright, Jr. – background vocals

Technical personnel
 Bob Ferguson – Producer
 Bill Walker – Contractor

Chart performance

Release history

References

Footnotes

Books

 

1966 albums
Connie Smith albums
Albums produced by Bob Ferguson (music)
RCA Victor albums